Creagan may refer to:

James Creagan (born 1940), United States diplomat
Creagan railway station, former railway station in Argyll and Bute, Scotland
Creagan na Beinne, hill in the Scottish Highlands
An Creagán, Irish name of Creggan, County Tyrone, Northern Ireland

See also
Creaghan (disambiguation)
Creagen Dow (born 1991), American actor